Kertukmakhi (Dargwa: Кертугмахьи) is a rural locality (a selo) in Akushinsky Selsoviet, Akushinsky  District, Republic of Dagestan, Russia. The population was 662 as of 2010. There are 10 streets.

Geography 
Kertukmakhi is located on the right bank of the Akusha River, 3 km north of Akusha (the district's administrative centre) by road. Semgamakhi is the nearest rural locality.

References 

Rural localities in Akushinsky District